Beloye Ozero (Aq Kül) is a rural locality (a selo) and the administrative centre of Beloozersky Selsoviet, Gafuriysky District, Bashkortostan, Russia. The population was 1,325 as of 2010. There are 20 streets.

Geography 
Beloye Ozero is located 30 km northwest of Krasnousolsky (the district's administrative centre) by road. Daryino is the nearest rural locality.

References 

Rural localities in Gafuriysky District